Bethel Historic District can refer to:
 Bethel Historic District (Bethel, Delaware), listed on the NRHP in Delaware
 Bethel Historic District (Bethel, Missouri), listed on the NRHP in Missouri
Bethel Village Historic District, Bethel, Vermont, listed on the NRHP in Vermont